Lucas Xavier Gazal (born 6 August 1999) is a Brazilian footballer who plays as a central defender for Atlético Goianiense.

Club career

Aparecidense
Born in Diadema, São Paulo, Gazal joined Aparecidense on 21 January 2021, from Red Bull Brasil, for the remainder of the 2020 season. He made his senior debut on 17 February, coming on as a half-time substitute but being sent off after just 11 minutes in a 2–1 Campeonato Goiano away loss against Atlético Goianiense.

Gazal became a regular starter for the Camaleão during the 2021 Série D, appearing in ten matches during the competition as the club achieved a first-ever promotion as champions. He scored his first senior goal on 26 June 2022, netting the opener in a 3–0 Série C away win over Volta Redonda.

Atlético Goianiense
On 22 July 2022, Gazal signed a two-year contract with Série A side Atlético Goianiense. He made his debut in the category on 6 August, his 23rd birthday, by starting in a 2–1 home success over Red Bull Bragantino.

Career statistics

Honours
Aparecidense
Campeonato Brasileiro Série D: 2021

References

External links
Futebol de Goyaz profile 

1999 births
Living people
Footballers from São Paulo (state)
Brazilian footballers
Association football defenders
Campeonato Brasileiro Série A players
Campeonato Brasileiro Série C players
Campeonato Brasileiro Série D players
Associação Atlética Aparecidense players
Atlético Clube Goianiense players
People from Diadema